The Plane Train is a 24/7 automated people mover (APM) made by Westinghouse Electric Corporation and maintained by Bombardier at Hartsfield–Jackson Atlanta International Airport that transports passengers between the terminals and the airside concourses. The system is the world's most heavily traveled airport APM, with 64 million riders .

System operation 

The Plane Train operates underground in two tunnels bracketing a pedestrian walkway in the airport's Transportation Mall. The system has eight stations that are all within the secure area of the airport, one at each of Concourses A, B, C, D, E and F (International Terminal), and two in the Domestic Terminalone at Concourse T, which is also the station for passengers from the Domestic Terminal heading to Concourses A–F, and one at the domestic baggage claim and ground transportation. The system operates with 11 four-car trains during peak periods.

The Domestic Baggage Claim and Concourses T, E and F stations have island platforms shared between the two tunnels, while Concourses A, B, C and D stations have each separate platforms servicing each tunnel. The platforms have Platform screen doors, all of which have a set of red lights that flash alternately to warn that the doors are closing, a feature present since the 1980s.

During regular service, trains run bi-directionally in the tunnels in a pinched-loop configuration. The east end of the line is Concourse F / International Terminal. During peak hours, the trains will stop at the eastbound side of the platform, unload and then proceed further to a cross-over track to return to the westbound side of the platform. During off-peak hours, trains cross-over prior to reaching the platform and arrive/depart from the westbound Concourse F platform. At the west end, trains use a cross-over track between Domestic Terminal and Concourse T stations to switch tunnels. The system has two maintenance workshops: One at concourse E and another at Concourse F. A third track runs parallel to the two main tracks between Concourses E and F, which connects the two maintenance facilities and is used for testing trains during mainenance.

Since the train operates inside the secure area of the airport, arriving passengers ending their journeys at the International terminal cannot use the train and must instead take a lengthy ground transportation detour around the perimeter of the airport to access facilities such as the car rental centre or MARTA station. (Departing international passengers entering the International Terminal may use the train to access Concourse E or the other concourses.)

On the platforms and inside the trains, color video displays provide system information in eight languages (English, French, German, Spanish, Japanese, Chinese, Arabic and Korean) as well as information about dining and shopping options in the concourses. Platform displays announce the time of arrival for the next train and its destination.

Audible announcements deliver station information and warn passengers of the train's movements. The messages use the NATO phonetic alphabet to identify each concourse station. For instance, the message announcing Concourse B says:  The one exception to this is Concourse D, which uses the APCO radiotelephony spelling alphabet where "David" is used rather than "Delta" to avoid confusion with Delta Air Lines, which operates its main hub at ATL. Historically, this terminal had been named "Dixie", but was renamed in 2020 because of the historical connotations of the term. 

From 1 a.m. to 5 a.m., the Plane Train runs in a reduced service mode, with only 2 trains both running on one track back and forth. The two trains pass each other in a siding near the Concourse B platforms in this configuration. The remaining trains receive routine maintenance at this time.

The airport says it takes three shifts of more than 100 employees to keep the plane train running 24 hours a day. While the trains are self driving, there are always two control operators on duty.

History 

The airport began planning the current terminal facility in the late 1960s. A people mover system had always been in the plan to transport passengers over the facility's long distances, which included hubs for Delta Air Lines and the now-defunct Eastern Air Lines.

An early design for the terminal included an east–west roadway system through the center of the complex. 16 terminals with perpendicular linear concourses would have existed along both sides of the roadway with an elevated people mover running in a loop connecting the terminals. This design, which was heavily influenced by Dallas/Fort Worth International Airport, was scrapped since it was more of a benefit to passengers originating in or terminating in Atlanta, and by then nearly 70% of traffic through the airport was connecting from one flight to another.

By 1973, the terminal's design was revised to its current layout, which used a landside/airside design made popular by Tampa International Airport. The people mover would connect the landside terminal with parallel linear airside concourses with a stop at each concourse. Initially, the plan was for the people mover to connect the concourses in an exposed trench similar to the original AirTrans system at Dallas/Fort Worth International Airport. Bridges over the people mover would have connected the aircraft ramps on either side. In 1975, a winter storm in the Dallas/Fort Worth area brought that system to a stand-still. Since Atlanta was vulnerable to similar conditions, the design was changed to have the people mover system fully underground to protect it from the elements. This would also eliminate the need for taxiway bridges.

Construction began on the current terminal facility in 1977. The terminal opened to the public on September 21, 1980, along with the Plane Train (which did not have an official name at the time). The system was built by the Westinghouse Electric Corporation, who supplied the system's initial fleet of C-100 vehicles. The initial system consisted of the six stations from the terminal (now the Domestic Terminal) up to Concourse D.

In 1994, the system was extended with a new station for Concourse E (which was constructed for international flights in preparation for the 1996 Summer Olympics, which were held in Atlanta). 

In 1996, the trains lengthened from three cars to four and large LED displays capable of showing eastern Asian CJK characters were added inside the vehicles to complement the original English text-only dot-matrix red-LED displays in preparation for more international flights.

In 2001, Bombardier Transportation, who recently acquired the remains of Westinghouse's transportation division after buying out Adtranz, replaced some of the system's original C-100 vehicles with new CX-100 vehicles. Two of the system's original vehicles (cars #1 and #53) were then donated to the Southeastern Railway Museum in nearby Duluth, Georgia where they are currently on display.

Having operated without an official name since its opening, the system was officially given its current name of "The Plane Train" on August 10, 2010. This follows the trend of other airports naming their people mover systems.

In 2012, the Maynard Holbrook Jackson, Jr. International Terminal and Concourse F opened along with another extension of the Plane Train. Ten additional vehicles were added to the system to accommodate this expansion, bringing the total number of Innovia APM 100 vehicles in the system's fleet to 59. The airport also recommissioned a few C-100 vehicles to keep more trains running.

Audio announcements 
The audio announcements on the Plane Train have been delivered by many voices throughout its history. The first voice on the trains was the voice of local WSB-FM and WQXI radio personality Kelly McCoy. President Jimmy Carter, a Georgia native, was scheduled to tour the terminal before its opening and Westinghouse needed to get announcements recorded quickly to have the system ready for the tour. Westinghouse reached out to McCoy to quickly record the announcements. McCoy's voice remained on the train briefly after the airport opened, though airport officials felt his voice was too friendly and not getting people's attention.

Shortly after opening, McCoy's voice was replaced by a monotone synthesized voice. Airport officials would nickname the voice "HAL" since it sounded like the similarly named computer in the film 2001: A Space Odyssey.

When Concourse E opened in 1994, the synthesized voice was replaced by a pre-recorded voice. However, due to public outcry, the synthesized voice was quickly brought back and would remain for two more years. As the 1996 Summer Olympics in Atlanta drew closer, the airport sought to again replace the synthesized voice with a pre-recorded voice fearing that the influx of international travelers would have a hard time understanding the synthesized voice. By the time the Olympics started, the airport again replaced the synthesized voice with a pre-recorded male voice provided by local voice talent Bill Murray (not to be confused with actor/comedian Bill Murray). The 1996 recordings also used chimes to precede the messages.

A different pre-recorded male voice debuted inside the trains in 2002, a year after the new vehicles debuted on the system. The 2002 recordings did not have chimes, though the doors closing message and its associated chime from the 1996 recordings would continue to be used on the platforms until the mid-2010s.   

In 2006, the system's first female voice debuted, which was provided by the voice of Susan Bennett. Bennett is the voice of Delta Air Lines gate boarding announcements at the airport and has since become famous for being the original voice of Siri on Apple products. The 2006 recordings were also the first to use a radiotelegraphy alphabet to clarify the identification of the Concourse stations.

The current announcements, which debuted in March 2012, are provided by voice actress Sharon Feingold, who also provides those for the ATL SkyTrain. They are the first to no longer use the word "Concourse", instead referring to the concourse stations with the word "Gates", e.g. "A Gates". They also added the name of the train, returned chimes, and added announcements for the International Terminal and Concourse F (which opened that year).

By the mid-2010s, the 1996–2002 voice of Bill Murray was still in use in the stations (including the Concourse F station when it first opened) to alert passengers when the doors close, stating:  This message was updated between 2013 and 2015 with a new male voice and the same chime as the current in-vehicle chime.

Future 
The airport is currently constructing a minor expansion to the Plane Train. A new 700-foot turn-around track is being constructed beyond the Domestic Terminal station. When complete in 2024, this will allow up to 15 trains at a time to operate at 90-second intervals.

See also 
List of airport people mover systems

References

External links 

Official Hartsfield–Jackson Atlanta International Airport website

Public transportation in Georgia (U.S. state)
Transportation in Atlanta
Airport people mover systems in the United States
Hartsfield–Jackson Atlanta International Airport
Innovia people movers
Railway lines opened in 1980